Kirk Schornstein (born 19 March 1993) is a Canadian paralympic alpine skier. He participated at the 2010, 2014 and 2018 Winter Paralympics in the alpine skiing competition. Schornstein also participated at the 2017 World Para Alpine Skiing Championships, being awarded the silver medal in the men's downhill standing event.

References

External links 
 
 

1993 births
Living people
Alpine skiers at the 2010 Winter Paralympics
Alpine skiers at the 2014 Winter Paralympics
Alpine skiers at the 2018 Winter Paralympics
Canadian male alpine skiers
Paralympic alpine skiers of Canada
Sportspeople from Edmonton